is an extreme trans-Neptunian object, detached, on a highly eccentric orbit in the outermost region of the Solar System. It was first observed on 8 September 2015, by astronomers with Outer Solar System Origins Survey using the 3.6-meter Canada–France–Hawaii Telescope at Mauna Kea Observatories, Hawaii, in the United States.

Orbit and classification 

 belongs to a small group of detached objects with perihelion distances of 30 AU or more, and semi-major axes of 150 AU or more. These extreme trans-Neptunian objects (ETNOs) can not reach such orbits without some perturbing object, which lead to the speculation of Planet Nine. It is also denoted at extended detached disc object or extreme distant detached object (EDDO).

It orbits the Sun at a distance of 45.6–788 AU once every 8512 years (3,109,107 days; semi-major axis of 417 AU). Its orbit has an exceptionally high eccentricity of 0.89 and an inclination of 12° with respect to the ecliptic.

The body's observation arc begins with a precovery taken at Mauna Kea on 23 June 2015, or 11 weeks prior to its official first observation.

Numbering and naming 

As of 2018, this minor planet has neither been numbered nor named by the Minor Planet Center. The official discoverers will be defined when the object is numbered.

Physical characteristics 

According to American astronomer Michael Brown and to the Johnston's archive,  measures 128 and 130 kilometers in diameter based on an assumed albedo of 0.09 and 0.08, respectively. On his website, Michael Brown lists this object as "possibly" a dwarf planet (200–400 km) which is the least certain category in his 5-class taxonomic system. As of 2018, no rotational lightcurve has been obtained from photometric observations. The body's rotation period, pole and shape remain unknown.

See also

References

External links 
 OSSOS VI. Striking Biases in the detection of large semimajor axis Trans-Neptunian Objects 16 Jun 2017
 List Of Centaurs and Scattered-Disk Objects, Minor Planet Center
 
 

Minor planet object articles (unnumbered)
Discoveries by OSSOS
20150908